Padang Rengas (Jawi: ڤادڠ رڠاس) is a small town in Kuala Kangsar District, Perak, Malaysia.

It has a police station, railway station, rural health centre, market and Schools ~ SJK(C) Khiu Min, SK Tun Dr. Ismail, SK Perempuan & SMK Tun Perak, including a Technical-based education school. Padang Rengas has a major cement manufacturing complex and surrounded by rubber estates.

A site of interest is Gunung Pondok, a large limestone hill that is being actively quarried by YTL.

Transportation
 Padang Rengas railway station. It is served by the KTM ETS and KTM Komuter. The station happens to be the terminus of the  line from Padang Rengas to Butterworth station. ETS Platinum services do not stop at this station so passengers would have to go to Kuala Kangsar station which is the nearest to Padang Rengas.

Kuala Kangsar District
Towns in Perak